The Brave Archer 2, also known as Kungfu Warlord 2, is a 1978 Hong Kong film adapted from Louis Cha's novel The Legend of the Condor Heroes. The film was produced by the Shaw Brothers Studio and directed by Chang Cheh, starring Alexander Fu Sheng and Niu-niu in the lead roles. The film is the second part of a trilogy and was preceded by The Brave Archer (1977) and followed by The Brave Archer 3 (1981). The trilogy has two unofficial sequels, The Brave Archer and His Mate (1982) and Little Dragon Maiden (1983).

Cast
 Alexander Fu Sheng as Guo Jing
 Niu-niu as Huang Rong
 Ku Feng as Hong Qigong
 Philip Kwok as Zhou Botong
 Wang Lung-wei as Ouyang Feng
 Ku Kuan-chung as Huang Yaoshi
 Danny Lee as Ouyang Ke
 Lee I-min as Yang Kang
 Kara Hui as Mu Nianci
 Norman Chui as Qiu Chuji
 Bruce Tong as Tan Chuduan
 Suen San-cheung as Liu Chuxuan
 Yu Tai-ping as Hao Datong
 Siu Yuk-lung as Ma Yu
 Robert Tai as Wang Chuyi
 Hung Ling-ling as Sun Bu'er
 Yu Sha-li as Shagu
 Lam Jan-kei as Cheng Yaojia
 Tsai Hung as Ke Zhen'e
 Lam Fai-wong as Zhu Cong
 Jamie Luk as Nan Xiren
 Chow Kin-ping as Quan Jinfa
 Lee Fung as Han Xiaoying
 Lo Mang as Qiu Qianren
 Wong Ching-ho as Elder Peng
 Sun Chien as Lu Guanying
 Yu Hoi-lun as Mei Chaofeng
 Wai Pak as Qu Lingfeng
 Yu Wing as Wanyan Honglie
 Chan Shen as Lingzhi Shangren
 Keung Hon as Liang Ziweng
 Suen Shu-pei as Sha Tongtian
 Lu Feng
 Chiang Sheng
 Dick Wei
 Tony Tam
 Lau Fong-sai
 To Wing-leung
 Ha Kwok-wing
 Lai Yau-hing
 Cheung Sek-au
 Cheung Chok-chow
 Chan Hung

External links
 
 

1978 films
Films based on works by Jin Yong
Hong Kong martial arts films
1970s Mandarin-language films
Shaw Brothers Studio films
Films set in the Jin dynasty (1115–1234)
Films set in the Mongol Empire
Films based on The Legend of the Condor Heroes
Wuxia films
Films directed by Chang Cheh
1970s Hong Kong films